Darkinjung (Darrkinyung; many other spellings; see below) is an Australian Aboriginal language, the traditional language of the Darkinjung people. While no audio recordings of the language survive, several researchers have compiled wordlists and grammatical descriptions. It has been classified as a language no longer fully spoken and it can be classified as needing a language renewal program. It was spoken adjacent to Dharuk, Wiradhuri, Guringai, Gamilaraay, and Awabakal.  The Darkinjung tribe occupied a small part of southeastern Australia inside what is now the New South Wales area.  They likely inhabited a considerable tract of land within Hunter, Northumberland, and Cook counties.

Alternate names 
The name of the language has various spellings as recorded by both Mathews and W.J. Enright, among others, whom worked off of documentation from the 19th century:
 Darkinjang (Tindale 1974)
 Darkinjung
 Darkiñung (Mathews 1903)
 Darrkinyung
 Darginjang
 Darginyung
 Darkinung
 Darkinoong
 Darknüng
 Darkinyung

Revitalisation effort 
Since 2003 there has been a movement from the Darkinyung language group to revitalise the language. They started working with the original field reports of Robert H. Mathews and W. J. Enright. Where there were gaps in the sparsely populated wordlists, words were taken from lexically similar nearby languages. This led to the publication of the work Darkinyung grammar and dictionary: revitalising a language from historical sources. This may be ordered from the publisher, Muurrbay Language Centre at http://www.muurrbay.org.au/muurrbay-resources/.

Phonology 
Much of our understanding of Darkinjung comes from papers published by R.H. Mathews in 1903. When analyzing these sources, we may generalize that there were around 15 consonants phonemes, and approximately 3 vowels.

Consonants 

In Darkinjung, like many Australian languages, b, d, and g are interchangeable with p, t, and k and will not change the meaning of the word.  The fact that this table shows b, d, and g is arbitrary.

Vowels

Morphology

"Tags" 

Darkinjung makes use of what Mathews refers to as "tags," or suffixes to denote relationships between objects in sentences.

Number tags -bula "two" and -biyn "several"
{|
|miri-bula
|-
|a couple of dogs
|}

Possessor Tag: -gayi
{|
|guri-||gayi||bargan
|-
|man||POSS||boomerang
|} 'a man's boomerang'

Locative "at, on, in" tags: -a/ -da/ -dja/ -ga/ -wa
The locative tags -ga and -wa appear to be found after stems ending in vowels.
{|
|gawin-da||nhayi
|-
|bank-Loc||that.over.there||
|}
'on the other side'

Words with locational information seem to coincide with nouns that also carry a locative tag:
{|
|wallang-gayn-dja||gundji-ga||gara-dhi
|-
|behind-?-Loc||hut-Loc||hide-Pres
|}
'around the house, hidden'

Ergative case tags: -a/ -da/ -ga/ -ya.  Words that end in the consonant ŋ receive that tag /-ga/
{|
|nyugang-ga||wagar||mana-yi
|-
|woman-Erg||perch||get-Past
|}
'the woman caught a perch'

References

Additional References

External links 
 Bibliography of Darkinjung people and language resources, at the Australian Institute of Aboriginal and Torres Strait Islander Studies

Extinct languages
Yuin–Kuric languages